Jana Lacinová is a Czech football player, who played for FC Hradec Králové in the Czech First Division.

She was a member of the Czech national team. Lacinová made her debut for the national team on 20 June 2012 in a match against Denmark.

References

1990 births
Living people
Czech women's footballers
Czech Republic women's international footballers
Women's association football forwards
FC Hradec Králové players